Islet cell autoantigen 1 is a protein that in humans is encoded by the ICA1 gene.

This gene encodes a protein with an arfaptin homology domain that is found both in the cytosol and as membrane-bound form on the Golgi complex and immature secretory granules. This protein is believed to be an autoantigen in insulin-dependent diabetes mellitus and primary Sjogren's syndrome. Alternatively spliced variants which encode different protein isoforms have been described; however, not all variants have been fully characterized.

References

Further reading